David Hartley is a former member of the Ohio House of Representatives.

References

Democratic Party members of the Ohio House of Representatives
Living people
Place of birth missing (living people)
Year of birth missing (living people)